Lidia Artyomovna Yakovleva (born 14 August 2001) is a Russian ski jumper.

Career 

She won her first World Cup event in Lillehammer in just her fourth World Cup performance.

World Cup

Standings

Individual wins

References

External links

2001 births
Living people
Russian female ski jumpers
Sportspeople from Kirov, Kirov Oblast